may refer to:

People
Chitose Hajime (born 1979), J-Pop singer
Chitose Morinaga, Japanese voice actress
Chitose Yagami (born 1969), Japanese manga artist
Tsuyoshi Chitose (born 1898), founder of Chito-ryu karate
Chitose Maki, Japanese manga artist

Places in Japan
Chitose, Hokkaido, a city on the island of Hokkaidō
Chitose River, a river on the island of Hokkaidō
Chitose, Ōita, a small village located in Ōno District, Ōita Prefecture
New Chitose Airport, serving the Sapporo metropolitan area
Chitose Air Base, a Japan Air Self-Defense Force base located in Chitose, Hokkaidō

Ships
Japanese cruiser Chitose, a 1897 protected cruiser of the Imperial Japanese Navy
Japanese aircraft carrier Chitose, a light aircraft carrier which served in World War II, built 1934

Characters
Chitose Hitotose (仁歳 チトセ, Hitotose Chitose), the protagonist of the anime series Happy Lesson
Chitose Akiyama, a character in the Japanese manga and anime Softenni
Chitose Karasuma (烏丸 千歳), the main protagonist in the media franchise Girlish Number
Chitose Hibiya, a character in the manga and anime series Chobits
Chitose Ikeda, a character in the manga and anime series YuruYuri
Chitose Mihara, a character in the manga Kobato
Chitose Karasuma (烏丸 ちとせ), a character in the media franchise Galaxy Angel
Chitose Tateyama, a character in the manga Buso Renkin
Chitose, a character in the game and media franchise Kantai Collection
Chitose Karasuyama, a character in the manga series D-Frag!
Yuma Chitose, a character in the manga Puella Magi Oriko Magica
Senri Chitose, a character in the manga and anime series The Prince of Tennis

Japanese feminine given names